Ultimate Poker.com was the first legal and regulated online poker site in the United States of America. Ultimate Poker operated in Nevada and New Jersey.

UltimatePoker.com went online at 9 AM PDT on April 30, 2013, providing online poker competitions to individuals in Nevada.  The initial operation started as a 30-day trial period to allow a shakeout of the technologies involved to determine adherence to the Nevada State Gaming Control Board's requirements for verifying that the player is physically within the state of Nevada and of the correct age.

On November 14, 2014, parent company Ultimate Gaming closed down its Ultimate Poker operation because the Nevada-based site's revenues fell far short of projected expectations.

References

2013 establishments in Nevada
2014 disestablishments in Nevada
Companies based in Summerlin, Nevada
Defunct poker companies
Station Casinos
Internet properties established in 2013
Internet properties disestablished in 2014
Gambling companies established in 2013
Gambling companies disestablished in 2014